Yunis Hunnar was the leader of the Sheikh Omar Hadid Brigade, a Salafi Jihadist group based in the Gaza Strip which carries out attacks against both Hamas and Israel.

Islamist militant activities and assassination
Hunnar's home in Gaza City was raided by Hamas Police on June 2, 2015, with Hamas later saying he had led the Sheikh Omar Hadid Brigade group (also known as ISIS in Gaza). Following his arrest, Yunis Hunnar was shot dead by the police forces. There have been conflicting reports on the cause and manner of his death. According to the Palestinian Centre for Human Rights:'...[Hamas] security services in the Gaza Strip killed Yunis Sa'id al-Hunnar while attempting to arrest him from his house in Shaikh Redwan neighbourhood in Gaza City...according to the al-Hunnar's wife, "at approximately 09:00 on Tuesday, 02 June 2015, a large number of armed persons in black, some of whom were masked, raided the house and opened fire. They then kept me in a room for about an hour, during which they searched the house and seized books and papers. When I went out of the room, I was surprised to see a pool of blood by the apartment's door. I then learnt that my husband was killed and they took his body"...'
The assassination of Yunis Hunnar came as part of a crackdown launched by Hamas on Islamic State in Iraq and the Levant (ISIL) affiliates in Gaza, which started when the Mujahideen Shura Council in the Environs of Jerusalem pledged allegiance to ISIL on February 11, 2014. The crackdown intensified when the Sheikh Omar Hadid Brigade ISIL affiliate officially formed in late May 2015.

References 

Year of birth missing
2015 deaths
Palestinian Sunni Muslims
Deaths by firearm in the Gaza Strip
Islamic State of Iraq and the Levant members
Leaders of Islamic terror groups